The rivière du Lac (English: River of the lake) is a tributary of the west bank of the Montmorency River. This watercourse flows on the north shore of the St. Lawrence River, in the city of Quebec, in the administrative region of Capitale-Nationale, in the province of Quebec, in Canada.

This valley is mainly served by the Lac-des-Roches road which passes on the north bank of this watercourse. Forestry is the main economic activity in this valley; second resort; agriculture (in the lower part around the village of Côte-du-Lac), third.

The surface of the Lac river is generally frozen from the beginning of December until the end of March; however, safe circulation on the ice is generally done from mid-December to mid-March. The water level of the river varies with the seasons and the precipitation; the spring flood occurs in March or April.

Geography 

The "rivière du Lac" rises at the confluence of two forest streams, ie:
  south of the summit of Mont Saint-Louis;
  south-west of the confluence of the Lac river and the Montmorency River;
  north-east of the summit of Mont des Épinettes Noires;
  east of Beauport Lake;
  west of the northwest shore of the St. Lawrence River.

Course of the Lac river

  towards the east crossing the Lac du Chemin de l'Aqueduc, to the dam at its mouth;
  to the east crossing a small unidentified lake which receives from the side south Sainte-Marie brook, to its mouth;
  towards the east by forming a curve towards the north to go through the village of Côte-du-Lac, to its mouth.

From the confluence of the Lac river, the current flows over  generally towards the south by the course of the Montmorency River, up to the northwest bank of the St. Lawrence River.

Toponymy 
The toponym "rivière du Lac" derives from the fact that this watercourse crosses the "Lac du Chemin de l'Aqueduc". A dam has been built at the mouth of this lake.

The toponym "Rivière du Lac" was formalized on December 5, 1968 at the Place Names Bank of the Commission de toponymie du Québec.

See also 

 Quebec (city), a city
 Capitale-Nationale, an administrative region
 Montmorency River
 St. Lawrence River
 List of rivers of Quebec

Notes and references 

Rivers of Capitale-Nationale